Kowloon Tong is a station on MTR's  and  in New Kowloon, Hong Kong. The station serves Kowloon Tong and its vicinity, including Yau Yat Tsuen, the Festival Walk shopping centre, City University of Hong Kong and Hong Kong Baptist University.

The station straddles the boundary between Kowloon City District and Sham Shui Po District.

Therefore, it is one of the busiest stations in the system.

History 
On 1 October 1910, the KCR British Section opened, including Beacon Hill Tunnel, but without any station at Kowloon Tong. Kowloon Tong station on the KCR opened on 4 May 1982, serving as an interchange point with the MTR.

On 1 October 1979, the first phase of the MTR's Modified Initial System opened to the public, including Kowloon Tong station. When the Tsuen Wan line opened, the Modified Initial System was split into two lines, and Kowloon Tong become a station of the newly designated Kwun Tong line.

The project included a new 60-metre subway linking to the MTR concourse (meaning the station now has two subways for transferring passengers). The new 1,800-square-metre concourse also included a new entrance (entrance D) on To Fuk Road. A passenger lift was also installed at entrance E at this time.

Layout 

There is a reserved space for a track connecting the East Rail line and the Kwun Tong line in the westbound tunnel just outside Kowloon Tong station towards Shek Kip Mei. The space was originally designed to allow the Metro Cammell EMUs to be transferred to the Kwun Tong line when they were unloaded at Hung Hom, but the track was never built as the MTR decided to use lorries to carry all of its train carriages to the Kowloon Bay Depot.

Note that the platforms for both the East Rail line and the Kwun Tong line are called platforms 1 and 2.

Entrances and exits 

A pedestrian walkway connects the station with Festival Walk, a major shopping centre.

Kwun Tong line concourse
A1: Suffolk Road
A2: Hong Kong Baptist Hospital/Hong Kong Baptist University
B: Suffolk Road
C1: Hong Kong Productivity Council
C2: Festival Walk/City University of Hong Kong 
E: EDB Education Services Centre 
East Rail line southern concourse
D: Public Transport Interchange 
East Rail line northern concourse
F: Kent Road 
East Rail line platform 2 (ground level)
G1: To Fuk Road 
G2: Festival Walk
East Rail line platform 1 (ground level)
H: Hong Kong Productivity Council 

Exit H is also accessible from the East Rail line northern concourse. It is possible to walk between Exit A and E in the vicinity of the station without entering the paid area. The same goes for Exit B, C, F and H.

Gallery

References 

Kowloon Tong
MTR stations in Kowloon
East Rail line
Kwun Tong line
Former Kowloon–Canton Railway stations
Railway stations in Hong Kong opened in 1979
1979 establishments in Hong Kong